"Straight to Hell" is a song by American Southern rock band Drivin N Cryin, from their 1989 album, Mystery Road. In 2014, a cover version appeared as the last track on the album Cherlene, an Archer tie-in sung by Jessy Lynn Martens as fictional character Cheryl Tunt. In 2018, American country music singer Darius Rucker released a cover version as the third single from his album When Was the Last Time.

Content
Writer and band member Kevn Kinney said of the song, "It's just about a latchkey kid whose mother is dating and they have different rules. It's got a little bit of 'Romeo and Juliet' to it, but it's mostly about my sister's life, but it's also about everybody's life, that's why I think people identify so much with it."

Darius Rucker version

In 2017, country musician Darius Rucker recorded the song for his album When Was the Last Time. Rucker's version features guest vocals from Jason Aldean, Luke Bryan, and Lady Antebellum co-lead vocalist Charles Kelley.

Rucker said that he chose to record the track because he had noticed the positive reaction it got when he first began his musical career and sang the song in bars. He was encouraged to record it after Kelley called Rucker, suggesting that he record the song and include Kelley on guest vocals. Rucker's version features a softer and more country music-influenced arrangement than the original version.

Charts

References

1989 songs
2018 singles
Darius Rucker songs
Jason Aldean songs
Luke Bryan songs
Capitol Records singles
Drivin N Cryin songs
Charles Kelley songs
Song recordings produced by Ross Copperman
Songs written by Kevn Kinney
Vocal collaborations